Madanmohan Dutta was an Indian politician. He was elected to the Odisha Legislative Assembly from Balasore constituency in the 2019 Odisha Legislative Assembly election as a member of the Bharatiya Janata Party. Dutta died of cardiac arrest on 17 June 2020. Dutta was admitted in Bhubaneswar was undergoing liver-related ailments.

References

1957 births
2020 deaths
Members of the Odisha Legislative Assembly
Bharatiya Janata Party politicians from Odisha
People from Balasore district
Odisha MLAs 2019–2024